The Curtis Peaks form a small cluster of peaks surmounting the end of the ridge which extends east from Mount Hall of the Lillie Range, in the Queen Maud Mountains. They were discovered and photographed by the U.S. Ross Ice Shelf Traverse Party (1957–58) led by A.P. Crary, and named for Lieutenant Commander Roy E. Curtis, U.S. Navy, a pilot with U.S. Navy Squadron VX-6 during Operation Deep Freeze.

References
 

Mountains of the Ross Dependency
Dufek Coast